East Bend Church, also known as the Methodist Episcopal Church (South), is a historic church in Boone County, Kentucky near Rabbit Hash.  It was added to the National Register of Historic Places in 1989.

It is a gable-front building with four windows on each side.  It has common bond brickwork.

References

See also
National Register of Historic Places listings in Kentucky

Churches on the National Register of Historic Places in Kentucky
National Register of Historic Places in Boone County, Kentucky
Methodist churches in Kentucky
Churches in Boone County, Kentucky
Greek Revival church buildings in Kentucky